Double A 93.3 Padaba FM (DZAA 93.3 MHz) is an FM station owned and operated by Our Lady's Foundation. Its studios and transmitter are located at Virac, Catanduanes.

References

External links
Padaba FM FB Page

Radio stations in Catanduanes
Radio stations established in 2009